Bhanji Jadeja, also known as Bhanji Dal Jadeja, was a commander of Nawanagar State army and jagirdar of Guana jagir. He commanded Jam Sataji's force during Mughal attack on Junagadh State and defeated the attack.

References 

Year of birth missing
Place of birth missing
Date of birth missing
Date of death missing
Indian military personnel